Duel of Champions (Italian: Orazi e Curiazi) is a 1961 film about the Roman legend of the Horatii, triplet brothers from Rome who fought a duel against the Curiatii, triplet brothers from Alba Longa in order to determine the outcome of a war between their two nations.

This film was directed by Ferdinando Baldi and Terence Young. The screenplay was written by Ennio De Concini, Carlo Lizzani, Giuliano Montaldo and Luciano Vincenzoni. It was shot at the Cinecittà Studios in Rome.

Plot
During the period prior to the unification of Alba and Rome, the legendary Roman hero Horatius leads his troops against the forces of Alba in the region of Tullus Hostilius. He is wounded and taken prisoner but escapes and hides in the hills.

The king of Rome, believing Horatio to have been a coward, announces the engagement of his daughter Marcia to Horatio's brother Marcus, whom he names his heir.

Both Alba and Rome are anxious to find a peace. After consulting an oracle, the two kings decide that three brothers from each side should compete in a fight to the death, the winning side to dominate in the unification of the two kingdoms.

Horatio comes back to Rome, but finding his name dishonored and Marcia married, he returns to the hills.

On the day of the contest, however, he comes to fight alongside his two brothers. Both are killed. Horatio continues the fight alone and kills the three Alban brothers, including Curiazio, who was the lover of Horatio's sister, Horatia. She stabs herself to death. Horatio is now free to marry Marcia.

Cast
Alan Ladd as Horatius
Franca Bettoia as Marcia
Franco Fabrizi as Curiatius
Robert Keith as Tullus Hostilius
Jacqueline Derval as Horatia
Luciano Marin as Eli
Andrea Aureli as Gaius Cluilius
Mino Doro as Caius
Osvaldo Ruggieri as Warrior of Alba
Jacques Sernas as Marcus

Production
Tiberia Films had to cooperate with Lux Film in order to finance the venture. Lux were making a number of movies aimed at the international market around this time, others including The Tartars, The Thief of Bagdad, and The Wonders of Aladdin.

The film was originally called Horatio and was also known as Ojario and The Gladiator of Rome. Shooting took place in Yugoslavia and Rome. 
Ladd walked off the set after 11 weeks of filming because he had not been paid. When his salary was guaranteed he resumed filming. "My advice to any American actor making a film abroad is to develop his own foreign policy beforehand", said Ladd. "My own, for the future, will be 'Speak softly, but carry an iron contract'."

Bibliography

See also
 List of historical drama films

References

External links
 
 
Complete copy of film at Internet Archive
 at Vernon Johns

1961 films
Films set in ancient Rome
Films based on classical mythology
Films set in Italy
Peplum films
Films directed by Ferdinando Baldi
Films directed by Terence Young
1960s Italian-language films
English-language Italian films
Films set in the 7th century BC
Lux Film films
Italian historical films
1960s historical films
Films scored by Angelo Francesco Lavagnino
Sword and sandal films
Films shot at Cinecittà Studios
Films with screenplays by Luciano Vincenzoni
1960s Italian films